York's Chocolate Story is a visitor attraction and chocolate museum on King's Square, in York. Opened in March 2012, it shows the history of chocolate making in York, including the Rowntree's factory which opened in 1890, owned since 1988 by Nestlé.

The attraction is located in the centre of York, in King's Square. In 2018 it won gold in the Guided Tour of the Year category of the VisitEngland Awards.

References

External links

 York's Chocolate Story
 Educational Visits UK
 Design

2012 establishments in England
Chocolate museums
Economy of North Yorkshire
Food museums in the United Kingdom
Museums established in 2012
Museums in York